= Pedro Pablo Sanguineto =

Sailor, geographer, and Spanish governor of the Malvinas Islands

Pedro Pablo Sanguineto (1760 - 1806), also known as Sanguineti, Sangineto or Sanguinetto, was a sailor, geographer, and Spanish governor of the Malvinas Islands (Falkland Islands). He was Spanish governor of the Malvinas Islands in 1791 to 1792, then from 1793 to 1794, and finally in 1795 to 1796.

Sanguineto Bay, in Argentina, was named after him in his honour
